The Bolivian Union Party was a political party in Bolivia. The party positioned itself as a 'revolutionary democratic centre-left nationalist' party. It was founded as a continuation of the Sucrist National Union Party (Partido Unión Nacional Sucrista). The party contested the 1979 presidential election, with Walter Gonzáles Valda as its candidate. González Valda obtained 19,997 votes (1.1% of the national vote).

In 1982, the collective leadership of the party consisted of Walter Gonzáles Valda, Hernán Ichazo Gonzáles, Francisco Silva and Napoléon Calvimontes.

References

Nationalist parties in Bolivia
Defunct political parties in Bolivia